Ahmad Adnan Jalloul (born 23 January 1992) is a Lebanese footballer who plays as a midfielder for  club Safa.

Career statistics

International

Honours 
Safa
 Lebanese Premier League: 2011–12, 2012–13, 2015–16
 Lebanese FA Cup: 2012–13
 Lebanese Elite Cup: 2012
 Lebanese Super Cup: 2013

Nejmeh
 Lebanese Elite Cup: 2017, 2018

Safa
 Lebanese Challenge Cup runner-up: 2022

Individual
 Lebanese Premier League Team of the Season: 2015–16

References

External links

 
 
 
 
 

1992 births
Living people
Footballers from Beirut
Lebanese footballers
Association football midfielders
Safa SC players
Nejmeh SC players
Lebanese Premier League players
Lebanon international footballers